The Kerbalai Israfil Hajiyev's Mansion is a building situated on 12 Jafar Jabbarli Street in the Yasamal district of Baku. By the order of the Cabinet of Ministers of the Republic of Azerbaijan, dated with 2 August 2001, the building was taken under state protection as an architectural monument of history and culture of national importance (No: 171).

Description 

The building was built in 1910-1912 by the civil engineer Józef Płoszko. The modeling of the bulk masses in the composition of the building speaks of the classical divisions traditions violation. The composition scheme is quite dynamic and has the features inherent to the bright modernity. The façade's structure with two tower-like ends of flanking projections, characteristic lines of arches, floor openings, profiles inherent to Art Nouveau, and the richness of details created a special architecture do not violating the overall harmony. The Baku Art Nouveau is distinguished from Moscow and St. Petersburg Art Nouveau (with their molding of concrete and plaster), by a special drawing of ornamental motives of the tympanum of arches, completed projections, individual architectural details conveyed by the deep relief of stone carving. The plasticity of the facade continues in the broken line of the cornice, the perspective solution of the arched openings and in the very plane of the wall with the architectural details of the Art Nouveau.

The building's interior is distinguished by a marble front staircase, thin characteristic lines of the cornice pattern, plafonds and doors with stained-glass windows. A particular attention is drawn to the cabinet ceiling.

The building is an architectural monument and an integral part of the historical heritage of the city.

See also 
 Alibeyovs’ House
 Mitrofanov Residence
 Property of Haji Mustafa Rasulov

References

Houses in Azerbaijan
Houses completed in 1912
Architecture in Azerbaijan
Józef Płoszko buildings and structures